Why Black Man Dey Suffer is an album by Nigerian Afrobeat composer, bandleader, and multi-instrumentalist Fela Kuti recorded in 1971 and originally released on the Nigerian African Sounds label after EMI refused to release it.

Reception

The Allmusic review awarded the album 4½ stars, stating: "Why Black Man Dey Suffer is a relatively early chapter in the Fela discography, originally recorded in 1971. Put to tape with early band Africa 70 and Cream drummer/Afro-beat enthusiast Ginger Baker on board as well, the record is made up of two extensive, repetitive, and loping pieces."

Track listing
All compositions by Fela Kuti 
 "Why Black Man Dey Suffer" – 15:15
 "Ikoyi Mentality Versus Mushin Mentality" – 12:56

Original art cover/painting (1971)
Grace Okotie-Eboh Oduro 
 "Why Black Man Dey Suffer" All Rights reserved (Painting Copy write – Grace Okotie-Eboh Oduro)
 "Reason behind the painting was to depict the slavery and exploitation of the African(Black Man) by the Europeans and the Arabs"

Personnel
Fela Kuti – electric piano, vocals
 Tonny Njoku – trumpet
Igo Chico – saxophone
Tony Allen, Ginger Baker – drums

References

Fela Kuti albums
Ginger Baker albums
1971 albums
Afrobeat albums